Go For Gold is a sport sponsorship program of the Powerball Marketing and Logistics Corp. supporting Filipino athletes and teams competing in various sports. It organizes the Go for Gold Philippines UCI Continental road cycling team.

It has supported athletes in other sports such as triathlon, sepak takraw, dragonboat and skateboarding.

The Go For Gold program began with cycling. In 2016, Powerball Marketing and Logistics Corp. decided to form a cycling team under the Go For Gold name. Since then Poweball has branched out to supporting other sports.

In 2019, FIBA made a promotional partnership agreement with Go For Gold to promote the 2019 FIBA Basketball World Cup, which was hosted in China, in the Philippines.

Teams

Notes
1. Covers the period when the team is sponsored by Go for Gold, if the team was not formed by Go For Gold itself.

See also
Gintong Alay
Siklab Atleta

References

2016 establishments in the Philippines
Sports organizations of Asia
Sports in the Philippines